Eoreuma evae is a moth in the family Crambidae. It was described by Alexander Barrett Klots in 1970. It is found in the US state of Arizona.

References

Haimbachiini
Moths described in 1970